Clifford Coffin (1913–1972) was an American fashion photographer, particularly for Vogue magazine, and a "wild and eccentric bohemian". He has also been called "the greatest of Vogue magazine’s 'lost' photographers", and an "outspoken homosexual with a heroic appetite for self-destruction, his bad behaviour was legendary".

Clifford Coffin: The Varnished Truth – Photographs from Vogue 1945 to 1955 was an exhibition at London's National Portrait Gallery for three months in 1997.

Coffin suffered from alcoholism and drug addiction, and died of throat cancer in Pasadena, California, in 1972, aged 58.

References

1913 births
1972 deaths
20th-century American photographers
Fashion photographers
American gay artists
American LGBT photographers
20th-century American LGBT people